The Bnei Akiva Schools of Toronto (BAS Toronto) consist of two Modern Orthodox Jewish high schools, namely Ulpanat Orot girls school and Yeshivat Or Chaim boys school that are affiliated with Bnei Akiva, located in Toronto, Ontario, Canada.

Educational philosophy 

Yeshivat Or Chaim (founded 1973) and Ulpanat Orot (founded 1975) identify with the religious Zionist movement. Students are encouraged to regard Israel as the center of their spiritual and religious lives, and to spend the year after graduating learning in Israel at religious higher learning institutions. Yeshivat Or Chaim is the only Bnei Akiva yeshiva located outside of Israel.

Curriculum 
Both schools have a dual curriculum of Judaic and general studies for grades 9 through 12. General studies classes are held in English, and Hebrew studies classes are taught in both English and Hebrew.

Additional programs 
Chessed Program: Bnei Akiva Schools has been running a charity program since the beginning of its establishment, named after "Chesed"; from the Hebrew  "kindness. Activities have included "Pink Day", involving charity and wearing pink, for the sake of breast cancer awareness.

Athletics 
All Bnei Akiva Schools teams go by the team name "Knights". Or Chaim has a varsity and junior varsity basketball team that plays in the TDCAA. The Ulpana Knights play in the private school league and compete in basketball and volleyball. Ulpana also offers one-day soccer and tennis tournaments to compete representing the Knights or competing in single or double games, respectively. Or Chaim also has a soccer team, a cross country squad and runs basketball intramurals during lunchtime, which is organized by the convenor. During the 2015–2016, 2016–2017, 2017–2018 and 2022-2023 school years the schools had sent a team to run the Jerusalem Marathon for the organization SHALVA.

Post High School 
Following four years at Bnei Akiva Schools, many students attend Yeshivot and Seminaries in Israel for a gap year. Some of these institutions include Yeshivat Torat Shraga, Yeshivat Torah V'Avodah, Yeshivat HaKotel, Yeshivat Har Etzion, Yeshivat Sha'arei Mevaseret Tzion, Yeshivat Orayta, Yeshivat Reishit and Yeshivat Lev HaTorrah.

References

External links 
 Yeshivat Or Chaim & Ulpanat Orot Website

1973 establishments in Ontario
Educational institutions established in 1973
Educational institutions established in 1975
High schools in Toronto
Jewish schools in Canada
Jews and Judaism in Ontario
Orthodox Judaism in Canada
Orthodox Jewish educational institutions
Mesivtas
Private schools in Toronto